Joyce Rosalind Aryee (born 27 March 1947) is a Ghanaian former politician, business executive and minister. Aryee is recognized for having served Ghana for more than 40 years in both the public and private sectors. From 2001 to 2011, she served as the chief executive officer of the Ghana Chamber of Mines and was the first woman in Africa to have held that role. She has also held political roles in Ghana from the early years of the PNDC government. She is currently the executive director of Salt and Light Ministries, a para-church organization. She is an Honorary Council Member of the Ghana Association of Restructuring and Insolvency Advisors.

Early life and education
Born to a Fante mother and a Ga father, Joyce is the second of four children. During her early years, she lived with her family in North Suntreso, Kumasi where she started her early years of education at Methodist Primary School and Methodist Middle School. She later went to Achimota School and graduated in 1969 from the University of Ghana, Legon with a Bachelor of Arts (BA) Degree in English.

She was formerly married to Dr Charles Wereko-Brobby.

Career

Early career 
During her study in University of Ghana, she took a job (during holidays) at West Africa Examination Council in the Test Development and Research Office (TDRO). Also, she worked at the Ghana Museums and Monument Board with the administration. From 1976 to 1981, she worked as a Public Relations Officer at the then newly established Environmental Protection Council. Later moved to the Ghana Standards Board (currently Ghana Standards Authority) as Public Relations Officer.

Political career 
From 1982 to 1985 Aryee was appointed by ex-president of Ghana Jerry John Rawlings as the secretary of information for the PNDC. From 1985 to 1987 she was Minister of Education, and in 1987–88 Minister of Local Government. From 1988 to 2001 she was Minister of Democracy in the Office of the Prime Minister, and from 1993 to 2001 a Member of the National Defence Council.

Salt & Light Ministries 
Aryee is the founder and currently executive director of Salt & Light Ministries, a para-church organization. She also runs the Joyce Aryee Consult, which focuses in the areas of Management and Communications. She serves as a board member on several boards such as the Kinross Chirano Gold Mine Ghana board, the Mentoring Women Ghana board, and the Roman Ridge School Academic Board.

Harmonious Chorale 
Aryee serves as the chair of Harmonious Chorale, a music group in Ghana. She is the founder of the Salt and Light Ministries, a ministry set to encourage and motivate the Body of Christ.

Accra Mining Network 
Dr. Joyce Aryee is also the First Patron Extraordinaire of AMN, Accra Mining Network, the largest amorphous extractive industry professional organisation in the world.

Personal life
Joyce Aryee has been married twice; first to a medical doctor with whom she lived in Germany and then later to George Yves Wireko Brobbey.

Awards and honors
Aryee was given the Second Highest State Award, the Companion of the Order of the Volta in 2006 in recognition of her service to the nation. She is also the recipient of the Chartered Institute of Marketing, Ghana (CIMG), Marketing Woman of the Year Award for 2007 and the African Leadership on Centre for Economic Development's African Female Business Leader of the Year Award for 2009.

She was also awarded in 2012 with the Honorary Award of the Year 2012, as well as one of the pioneers and pillars of gospel music, at the Adom FM Ghana Gospel Industry Awards (GGIA) (2nd Edition).

Joyce Aryee was also honored in mining and public service at the maiden edition of the Women in Excellence award in 2011 and was nominated as the "2011 Woman of the Year" by the American Biographical Institute (ABI). She was the first female to receive the Inspirational Woman Award at the Ghana UK Based Achievement (GUBA) Awards 2015 for creating change, which paved the way for women. Again, she won an award as the Public Relations Personality of the Year 2014 by the Institute of Public Relations Ghana and was mentioned in the list of 100 Global Inspiration Women in Mining in the world.

Aryee is an Honorary Fellow of the Ghana Institution of Engineers and received an Honorary Doctorate from the University of Mines and Technology in recognition of her immense contributions to the growth of the mining industry.

Achimota School named their 17th dormitory, 'Rev Joyce R. Aryee House' after her, in honor of  her selfless service to the nation and commitment as well as contribution to her alma mater.

Publications 
Aryee has co-authored the book The Transformed Mind with Samuel Koranteng-Pipim.

References

External links
Mentoring Women Ghana Board
Salt and Light Ministries website
Footprints on Citi TV with Dr. Joyce Aryee

Living people
1947 births
Alumni of Achimota School
20th-century Ghanaian businesspeople
Ghanaian religious leaders
Education ministers of Ghana
Information ministers of Ghana
Local government ministers of Ghana
Recipients of the Order of the Volta
20th-century Ghanaian politicians
20th-century Ghanaian women politicians
21st-century Ghanaian politicians
21st-century Ghanaian women politicians
Women government ministers of Ghana
Ga-Adangbe people
Fante people
University of Ghana alumni